Enílton Menezes Miranda (born 11 October 1977) is a Brazilian footballer. In 2012 he was playing for Comercial as a striker.

Biography
Enílton was signed by Tigres UANL for US$1 million in 2002 from Coritiba and third parties owner "Planet Shorts". He unilaterally breach his contract with Tigres in order to return to Brazil for Atlético Mineiro. He signed a 1-year contract on 9 May 2003 but sold to Esporte Clube Vitória on 28 July 2003, in 3-year deal. Tigres sued Enílton to FIFA and then the Court of Arbitration for Sport, which the court awarded Tigres shall eligible to receive US$750,000 from Enílton, with Mineiro jointly responsible for breach of contract.

In December 2005 Enílton was signed by Palmeiras in 3-year contract. From 2007 to 2009 he spent his Palmeiras career on loan to other clubs. He also extended his contract in February 2008, to last until 31 December 2009. He spent the first half of 2009 at Paulista FC.

In January 2010 he was signed by Paysandu; he was signed by Brasiliense in March, until the end of 2011 League of Brazilian Federal District in May 2011. In January 2011 he was released again.

In January 2012 Enílton was signed by Bangu until the end of Rio de Janeiro state league. In February 2012 he was signed by Comercial de Ribeirão Preto.

Club statistics

Honours

Vitória

Campeonato Baiano: 2004

Sport

Campeonato Pernambucano: 2008
Copa do Brasil: 2008

References

External links
 
 

1977 births
Living people
Footballers from Rio de Janeiro (city)
Brazilian footballers
Brazilian expatriate footballers
Expatriate footballers in Switzerland
Expatriate footballers in Japan
Expatriate footballers in Mexico
Boavista Sport Club players
FC Sion players
Yverdon-Sport FC players
Coritiba Foot Ball Club players
Tigres UANL footballers
Clube Atlético Mineiro players
Esporte Clube Vitória players
Esporte Clube Juventude players
Sociedade Esportiva Palmeiras players
Omiya Ardija players
CR Vasco da Gama players
Sport Club do Recife players
Paulista Futebol Clube players
Paysandu Sport Club players
Brasiliense Futebol Clube players
Campeonato Brasileiro Série A players
Campeonato Brasileiro Série B players
Swiss Super League players
Swiss Challenge League players
J1 League players
Liga MX players
Association football forwards